Orthetrum glaucum is an Asian dragonfly species, common across much of tropical and subtropical Asia. The common name for this species is blue marsh hawk.

Description and habitat
It is a medium sized dragonfly with dark face and greenish blue eyes. The thorax of old males are dark blue due to pruinescence. Its wings are transparent with dark amber-yellow tint in the extreme base. Its abdomen is pruinosed with blue color up to segment 8; last two segments are black. It breeds in marshes associated with forest streams, plantations and canals.

References 

Insects described in 1865
Insects of Asia
Libellulidae